Hebb's Cross is a community in the Canadian province of Nova Scotia, located in the Municipality of the District of Lunenburg in Lunenburg County on Highway 103 about seven miles south-southwest of Bridgewater, between Hebbville and Italy Cross.

References
Hebb's Cross on Destination Nova Scotia

Communities in Lunenburg County, Nova Scotia
General Service Areas in Nova Scotia